Queen of Sheba (also known as Queen of Sheba Int'l Foods) is an Ethiopian restaurant in Portland, Oregon.

History 
The Black-owned restaurant opened during the 1990s. Alem Gebrehiwot was the owner, as of 2020.

Reception 
In 2016, 2017, and 2020, Willamette Week readers named Queen of Sheba the city's top Ethiopian restaurant in an annual "best of Portland" poll. In an overview of the city's "exceptional" Ethiopian food, Eater Portland's Maya MacEvoy wrote:

See also

 List of African restaurants

List of Black-owned restaurants

References

External links 

 
 

1990 establishments in Oregon
African culture in Oregon
Black-owned restaurants in the United States
Eliot, Portland, Oregon
Ethiopian American
Ethiopian cuisine
Restaurants in Portland, Oregon
African restaurants